Dewey Lindon "Spooner" Oldham (born June 14, 1943) is an American songwriter and session musician. An organist, he recorded in Muscle Shoals, Alabama, at FAME Studios as part of the Muscle Shoals Rhythm Section on such hit R&B songs as Percy Sledge's "When a Man Loves a Woman", Wilson Pickett's "Mustang Sally", and Aretha Franklin's "I Never Loved a Man (The Way I Love You)". As a songwriter, Oldham teamed with Dan Penn to write such hits as "Cry Like a Baby" (the Box Tops), "I'm Your Puppet" (James and Bobby Purify), and "A Woman Left Lonely" and "It Tears Me Up" (Percy Sledge).

Biography
Oldham is a native of Center Star, Alabama, United States.  He was blinded in his right eye as a child; when reaching for a frying pan, he was hit in the eye by a spoon he knocked from a shelf.  Schoolmates gave him the name "Spooner" as a result.

Oldham started his career in music by playing piano in a Dixieland jazz band while at Lauderdale County High School. He then attended classes at the University of North Alabama but turned instead to playing at FAME Studios. He moved to Memphis, Tennessee in 1967 and teamed with Penn at Chips Moman's American Studios.

Oldham later moved to Los Angeles and has continued to be a sought-after backing musician, recording and performing with such artists as Bob Dylan, Aretha Franklin,  Delaney Bramlett, Willy DeVille, Joe Cocker, the Hacienda Brothers, Linda Ronstadt, Jackson Browne, the Everly Brothers, Bob Seger, Dickey Betts, Cat Power, J.J. Cale, Frank Black, and The Mountain Goats.

Frequently a backing musician for Neil Young, he played on Young's critically acclaimed 1992 album Harvest Moon. Oldham also appeared in the concert film Neil Young: Heart of Gold and backed Crosby Stills Nash & Young on their 2006 Freedom of Speech tour.

In 1993, he joined a host of Memphis soul music veterans to record Arthur Alexander's comeback and un-intended final studio recording, the album Lonely Just Like Me.

In 2007, Oldham toured with the Drive-By Truckers on their The Dirt Underneath tour. In 2008, Oldham played on Last Days at the Lodge, the third album released by folk/soul singer Amos Lee. In May 2011, Oldham backed Pegi Young on a six-show tour of California.

Awards
Oldham was inducted into the Rock and Roll Hall of Fame in 2009 as a sideman.  In 2014, he was inducted into the Alabama Music Hall of Fame.

Solo album 
Pot Luck (Family Productions, 1972)

Collaborations 

With Arthur Alexander
 1962: You Better Move On (Dot Records)
 1993: Lonely Just Like Me (Elektra)

With Shelby Lynne
 Tears, Lies and Alibis (Everso, 2010)

With Steve Cropper
 Dedicated – A Salute to the 5 Royales (429 Records, 2011)

With Neil Young
 Comes a Time (Reprise Records, 1978)
 Old Ways (Reprise Records, 1985)
 Silver & Gold (Reprise Records, 2000)
 Prairie Wind (Reprise Records, 2005)

With Billy Ray Cyrus
 The SnakeDoctor Circus (BBR, 2019)

With Rita Coolidge
 Rita Coolidge (A&M Records, 1971)

With Linda Ronstadt
 Don't Cry Now (Asylum Records, 1973)

With Wilson Pickett
 The Exciting Wilson Pickett (Atlantic Records, 1966)
 The Wicked Pickett (Atlantic Records, 1967)
 The Sound of Wilson Pickett (Atlantic Records, 1967)

With John Prine
 Aimless Love (Oh Boy Records, 1984)
 A John Prine Christmas (Oh Boy Records, 1994)

With Jennifer Warnes
 Jennifer (Reprise Records, 1972)

With Aretha Franklin
 Aretha Arrives (Rhino Records, 1967)
 Lady Soul (Rhino Records, 1968)
 Aretha Now (Atlantic Records, 1968)
 Soul '69 (Atlantic Records, 1969)

With Dan Penn
 Nobody's Fool (Bell Records, 1973)
 Do Right Man (Sire Records, 1994)
 Moments From This Theatre (Proper American, 1999)
 Something About the Night (Dandy Records, 2016)

With Frank Black
 Honeycomb (Cooking Vinyl, 2005)
 Fast Man Raider Man (Cooking Vinyl, 2006)

With Jewel
 Pieces of You (Atlantic Records, 1995)

With Bob Seger
 Beautiful Loser (Capitol Records, 1975)

With Jackson Browne
 For Everyman (Asylum Records, 1973)

With Tony Joe White
 Closer to the Truth (Festival Records, 1991)

With Sheryl Crow
 Threads (Big Machine Records, 2019)

With J. J. Cale
 8 (Mercury Records, 1983)
 Travel-Log (Silvertone Records, 1990)
 Number 10 (Silvertone Records, 1992)
 Closer to You (Virgin Records, 1994)

With Amos Lee
 Last Days at the Lodge (Blue Note Records, 2008)

With Josh Groban
 Illuminations (143 Records, 2010)

With Maria Muldaur
 Maria Muldaur (Reprise Records, 1973)
 Waitress in a Donut Shop (Reprise Records, 1974)

With Bob Dylan
 Saved (Columbia Records, 1980)

With Keith Richards
 Crosseyed Heart (Reprise Records, 2015)

With Boz Scaggs
 Memphis (429 Records, 2013)

With Peter Parcek
 Mississippi Suitcase (Lightnin' Records, 2020)

References

External links

Spooner Oldham Interview, NAMM Oral History Library (2017)

1943 births
Living people
American session musicians
Songwriters from Alabama
Musicians from Alabama
People from Lauderdale County, Alabama
Muscle Shoals Rhythm Section members
Drive-By Truckers members
American rock keyboardists
American rock pianists
American male pianists
American organists
American male organists
Rhythm and blues pianists
American soul keyboardists
20th-century American pianists
21st-century American keyboardists
21st-century American pianists
21st-century organists
20th-century American male musicians
21st-century American male musicians
20th-century American keyboardists
Proper Records artists
American male songwriters
The Stray Gators members